Chapayevka may refer to:
Chapayevka, Azerbaijan (disambiguation), several places in Azerbaijan
Chapayevka (river), a river in Samara Oblast, Russia
Chapayevka, Russia, several rural localities in Russia

See also
Vasily Chapayev, Russian Red Army commander during the Civil War
Chapayevo (disambiguation)